Lajing Town is a town of Lanping Bai and Pumi Autonomous County in Yunnan province of China.

Township-level divisions of Nujiang Lisu Autonomous Prefecture